On the War Trail is a 1922 statue by Alexander Phimister Proctor, installed outside the Colorado State Capitol in Denver's Civic Center Park. The bronze sculpture depicts a Native American riding on a horse and carrying a spear.

References

External links

 

1922 establishments in Colorado
1922 sculptures
Bronze sculptures in Colorado
Equestrian statues in Denver
Outdoor sculptures in Denver
Sculptures by Alexander Phimister Proctor
Sculptures of men in Colorado
Sculptures of Native Americans